This is a list of the reptile species recorded in Latvia. The Latvian reptile fauna totals 7 species.

The following categories are used to highlight specific species' conservation status as assessed by the Red Data book of Latvia:

Lizards 
Sauria: 
 Sand Lizard (Lacerta agilis) – 4th category
 Viviparous lizard (Zootoca vivipara)
 Slowworm (Anguis fragilis)

Snakes 
Serpentes:
 Smooth snake (Coronella austriaca) – 1st category
 Grass snake (Natrix natrix)
 Adder (Vipera berus)

Turtles 
Testudines:
 European pond turtle (Emys orbicularis) – 1st category

References 

Latvia
Reptiles
Reptiles
Latvia